Keo Coleman is a former linebacker in the National Football League.

Biography
Coleman was born Keombani Coleman on May 1, 1970 in Los Angeles, California. He attended high school in Milwaukee, Wisconsin.

Career
he was drafted in the fourth round of the 1992 NFL Draft and spent that season with the team. He would spend the 1993 NFL season with the Green Bay Packers. After leaving the NFL he would join the Tampa Bay Storm of the Arena Football League.

He played at the collegiate level at Navarro College and Mississippi State University.

See also
List of New York Jets players
List of Green Bay Packers players

References

Players of American football from Los Angeles
Players of American football from Milwaukee
New York Jets players
Green Bay Packers players
Tampa Bay Storm players
American football linebackers
Navarro Bulldogs football players
Mississippi State Bulldogs football players
Living people
1970 births